4 Equulei is a binary star system in the constellation of Equuleus, located about 3° to the east of Alpha Equulei. With an apparent visual magnitude of 5.94, it is just barely visible to the naked eye under good seeing conditions. The system shows an annual parallax shift of 20.44 mas as measured from Earth's orbit, which yields a distance estimate of about 160 light years. It is moving closer to the Sun with a radial velocity of −13 km/s.

Griffin (2011) noted that the mass of the secondary component is likely to be at least equal to that of the Sun, which, for an ordinary main sequence star, should make it visible in the spectrum. The lack of significant ultraviolet emission appears to rule out a white dwarf companion. Instead, the secondary may consist of a binary pair of low mass dwarfs.

The visible component is an F-type main-sequence star with a stellar classification of F8 V. The spectrum of the star is unusual for its near absence of lithium. With an estimated age of about three billion years, it has 1.4 times the mass of the Sun and is spinning with a projected rotational velocity of 6 km/s. It is radiating five times the Sun's luminosity from its photosphere at an effective temperature of around 6,213 K. 4 Equulei is not known to harbor a planet. It has a magnitude 12.4 companion star located, as of 2012, at an angular separation of 30.70 arcseconds along a position angle of 301°.

References

F-type main-sequence stars
Spectroscopic binaries
Double stars
Equuleus
Durchmusterung objects
Equulei, 04
200790
104101
8077